Coyne Center is a census-designated place (CDP) in Rock Island County, Illinois, United States. The population was 827 at the 2010 census.

Geography

Demographics

At the 2000 census there were 906 people, 352 households, and 290 families living in the CDP. The racial makeup of the CDP was 98.68% White, 0.77% African American, 0.11% Asian, 0.22% from other races, and 0.22% from two or more races. Hispanic or Latino of any race were 0.88%.

Of the 352 households 28.1% had children under the age of 18 living with them, 71.3% were married couples living together, 6.8% had a female householder with no husband present, and 17.6% were non-families. 12.5% of households were one person and 4.8% were one person aged 65 or older. The average household size was 2.57 and the average family size was 2.80.

The age distribution was 20.8% under the age of 18, 5.4% from 18 to 24, 25.1% from 25 to 44, 33.1% from 45 to 64, and 15.7% 65 or older. The median age was 44 years. For every 100 females, there were 99.6 males. For every 100 females age 18 and over, there were 97.8 males.

The median household income was $50,000 and the median family income  was $47,422. Males had a median income of $30,909 versus $23,750 for females. The per capita income for the CDP was $19,093. About 3.1% of families and 4.3% of the population were below the poverty line, including 6.6% of those under age 18 and 1.3% of those age 65 or over.

References

Census-designated places in Rock Island County, Illinois
Census-designated places in Illinois
Unincorporated communities in Illinois
Cities in the Quad Cities